An order of precedence is a sequential hierarchy of nominal importance and can be applied to individuals, groups, or organizations. Most often it is used in the context of people by many organizations and governments, for very formal and state occasions, especially where diplomats are present. It can also be used in the context of decorations, medals and awards. Historically, the order of precedence had a more widespread use, especially in court and aristocratic life.

A person's position in an order of precedence is not necessarily an indication of functional importance, but rather an indication of ceremonial or historical relevance; for instance, it may dictate where dignitaries are seated at formal dinners.  The term is occasionally used to mean the order of succession—to determine who replaces the head of state in the event they are removed from office or incapacitated—as they are often identical, at least near the top.

What follows are the general orders of precedence for different countries for state purposes, such as diplomatic dinners, and are made under the assumption that such functions are held in the capital. When they are held in another city or region, local officials such as governors would be much higher up the order.  There may also be more specific and local orders of precedence, for particular occasions or within particular institutions.  Universities and the professions often have their own rules of precedence applying locally, based (for example) on university or professional rank, each rank then being ordered within itself on the basis of seniority (i.e. date of attaining that rank). Within an institution, the officials of that institution are likely to rank much higher in the order than in a general order of precedence—the chancellor or president of a university may well precede anyone except a head of state, for example. The same might be true for a mayor in their own city.

Lists (people)
Argentine order of precedence
Australian order of precedence
Barbadian order of precedence
Belgian order of precedence
Bangladesh order of precedence 
Brazilian order of precedence
Canadian order of precedence
Catholic Church order of precedence
Chilean order of precedence
Chinese order of precedence
Colombian order of precedence
Danish order of precedence
French order of precedence
German order of precedence
Greek order of precedence
Hong Kong order of precedence
Indian order of precedence
Order of precedence in the Republic of Ireland
Order of precedence in the Isle of Man
Israeli order of precedence
Italian order of precedence
Jamaican order of precedence
Order of precedence in Japan
Malaysian order of precedence
New Zealand order of precedence
Nepali order of precedence
Norwegian order of precedence
Warrant of Precedence for Pakistan
Philippine order of precedence
Polish order of precedence
Portuguese order of precedence
Order of precedence in Romania
Order of precedence in Russia
Order of precedence in Scotland
Singapore Order of Precedence
Spanish order of precedence
South Korean order of precedence
Sri Lankan order of precedence
Swedish order of precedence
Swiss order of precedence
Thai order of precedence
Turkish order of precedence
United Kingdom order of precedence
Order of precedence in England and Wales
Order of precedence in Scotland
Order of precedence in Northern Ireland
United States order of precedence

Lists (decorations and medals)
Australian Honours Order of Precedence
Canadian order of precedence (decorations and medals)
German order of precedence (decorations and medals)
Polish order of precedence (decorations and medals)
South African military decorations order of precedence
United States military order of precedence (decorations and medals)
Texas Military order of precedence (ribbons and medals)

See also
List of heads of state by diplomatic precedence
Order of succession
Precedence of Livery Companies in the City of London (U.K.)
Protocol
Style
Precedence among European monarchies

 
Etiquette